Monotropa is a genus of three species of herbaceous perennial flowering plants that were formerly classified in the family Monotropaceae and presently are classified in Ericaceae. They are native to temperate regions of the Northern Hemisphere and are generally rare. Unlike most plants they do not have chlorophyll and therefore are non-photosynthetic; rather, they are myco-heterotrophs that obtain food through parasitism on subterranean fungi. Because they do not need any sunlight to live, they can live in very dark sites such as the floor of deep sylvae. The name "Monotropa" is Greek for "one turn" as every plant has one large turn near the top of the plant.

Species
The genus consists of the following three species:

Monotropa coccinea
 Monotropa hypopitys

 Monotropa uniflora

Monotropa brittonii has been proposed as a separate species from Monotropa uniflora.

See also
 Sarcodes

External links
 
 
 Flora of China: Monotropa

References 

Monotropoideae
Ericaceae genera
Parasitic plants